Ox-tongue pastry or horse-ear pastry, also referred to as Chinese doughnut, is a Chinese pastry that is popular in south China in the provinces of Guangdong and Fujian. It is a fried dough food that is elliptical in shape and resembles an ox tongue or a horse ear. The pastry texture is chewy, with a soft interior and a crunchy crust. Ox-tongue pastry is lightly sweetened, and eaten as part of breakfast with soy milk. The pastry is made in a similar way as Youtiao, however, sugar is added to the flour.

See also
 List of doughnut varieties
 List of fried dough varieties
Mandazi, a similar East African pastry

Other Chinese fried dough dishes
 Ham chim peng
Shuangbaotai
Youtiao

References

 曾大平, (2002), 民間小吃製作圖解 (Traditional snacks in China), 萬里機構

External links

Cantonese cuisine
Hong Kong cuisine
Chinese doughnuts
Deep fried foods